The Trnovo Forest Plateau is a karst plateau that constitutes the extreme northwest end of the Dinaric Alps. The Trnovo Forest Plateau has a karst character, without surface watercourses and broken up by closed valleys, outcroppings, hills, caves, shafts, and smaller karst features: solution pans, rills, karrens, and other features. Significant karst features include ice caves.

The Trnovo Forest Plateau has three nature reserves:
 Big Paradana Ice Cave
 Golak Peaks and Spruce Valley (a karst depression)
 The Smrečje forest reserve

The southern ridge of the Trnovo Forest Plateau is Čaven.

Terrain 
The influence of tectonic activity is very evident in the area. There are many depressions, solution valleys, small karst poljes, and the remains of former river valleys. During the Pliocene the rivers leveled the tectonic upwelling and filled the valleys. Traces were also left by Pliocene glaciation because glaciers created small cirques on what had been a relatively level surface, as well as ground moraines and terminal moraines. The rivers transported gravel and deposited it in lower areas, filling the depressions.

Rock 
The north side of the plateau shows tectonic formation along the Idrija Fault oriented in the Dinaric direction, and the south side shows the results of tectonic thrusting of Mesozoic limestone and dolomite over younger Eocene flysch. Two-thirds of the surface is covered by limestone, one-fourth by dolomite, and the remainder is flysch and loose material.

Mountains 
The highest summit is Big Mount Golak (Veliki Golak). On the northern side, some other panoramic and frequently visited summits are Little Mount Golak (Mali Golak), Mount Poldanovec, and Pointed Peak (Špičasti vrh ), and on the southern side Big Mount Modrasovec (Veliki Modrasovec), Mount Kucelj, Blue Peak (Sinji vrh), and Kovk Hill.

Natural landmarks 

 Skozno natural rock window (above Šmihel)
 Otlica natural rock window (above Ajdovščina)
 Hubelj karst spring (above Ajdovščina)
 Vipava springs (near Vipava)
 Lijak karst spring
 Wild Lake (a Vauclusian spring and small lake with a deep unexplored siphon)
 Paradana Cave (a deep cave, with ice that was harvested and sold in the past)

Climate 
The climate of the Trnovo Forest Plateau is defined by its elevation and orientation. The Trnovo Forest Plateau lies in a continental temperature zone. Differences in the quantity of precipitation differ little on a monthly basis. The greatest precipitation is in November and the least in February. The majority of winter precipitation is in the form of snow, especially at higher elevations. The bora wind is a typical weather phenomenon, blowing down from the plateau towards the sea with gusts often exceeding . The bora can cause considerable damage in the area, uprooting trees and tearing the roofs off of houses.

Water 
Despite the abundant precipitation, karst plateaus have almost no water. The drainage divide is unclear because of the karst surface. The largest spring is that of the Hubelj River near Ajdovščina.

Vegetation 
The Trnovo Forest Plateau is covered by mixed beech and fir forest (Abieti-fagetum dinaricum). The highest vegetation is on Little Mount Golak, which is bare at the summit, below which grow dwarf willow (Salix sp.) and mountain pine (Pinus mugo). Protected flora grows in the rocky crevices, including the Carniolan primrose (Primula carniolica).

The share of forest is 75.5%, but this is increasing because of the afforestation of abandoned farmland. Poor accessibility has resulted in relatively good preservation of the landscape features. The highest peaks are overgrown with mountain pine or grass. At lower elevations this transitions into Dinaric submontane beech forest. There is relatively little shrubland.

Soil 
Chromic cambisol and rendzina have developed on Cretaceous and Jurassic limestone and on Triassic dolomite. More acidic soils are found only on limestone with chert. Due to karstification, the depth of regolith is very uneven. The substantial precipitation quickly erodes the soil, and it is also carried away by the bora wind in exposed locations.

Population 
The plateau had a population of 4,534 in the 1991 census, and the population density was only , making the area one of the most sparsely populated in Slovenia. Only the western part is inhabited. The settlements were formed through more recent high-elevation colonization, and the dominant patterns are clustered villages and isolated farms. The age profile of the population is unfavorable.

Economy 
In addition to forestry, farming is also an important economic activity. The basic farming activity is animal husbandry, especially raising cattle. The share of the farming population is 14.4%. Tourism is becoming increasingly important: the steep slopes of the plateau attract hikers, and some karst features also attract visitors, especially ice caves and sinkholes because of the vegetation associated with them.

References

External links
Trnovo Forest Plateau at Geopedia

Karst plateaus of Slovenia
Landscape parks in Slovenia
Plateaus in the Slovene Littoral